Punta Tagliamento Lighthouse is a lighthhose in Bibione a frazione of San Michele al Tagliamento, Veneto on the coast of the Adriatic Sea. It is placed on the beach protected by several seawalls placed as erosion control.

History
The lighthouse was built in 1913 on the Venetian side of the mouth of the Tagliamento river, which at that time was the northern border of the Kingdom of Italy. In 1917 the light was destroyed by a bombing during World War I but it was suddenly rebuilt; in 1952 the plant was electrified and in 1973 was completely automated.

The light is active, fully automated and operated by Marina Militare identified by the code number 4288 E.F.

See also
 List of lighthouses in Italy

References

External links

 Servizio Fari Marina Militare 

Lighthouses in Italy
Buildings and structures in Veneto